Compton—Frontenac was a federal electoral district in Quebec, Canada, that was represented in the House of Commons of Canada from 1949 to 1968.

History

This riding was created in 1947 from parts of Compton, Mégantic—Frontenac and Stanstead ridings.

It consisted of:
 the county of Compton and the towns of Cookshire, East Angus and Scotstown;
 in the county of Sherbrooke, the municipality of Compton and the villages of Compton and Waterville;
 in the county of Frontenac, the municipalities of Chesham, Ditchfield and Spaulding, Gayhurst, Gayhurst South-East, Marston South, St-Augustin-de-Woburn, Ste. Cécile-de-Whitton, St-Hubert-de-Spaulding, St. Léon-de-Marston, St. Sébastien, Winslow North, Winslow South, the village of St. Sébastien and the town of Mégantic; and
 in the county of Stanstead, the municipality and the village of St. Herménégilde.

It was abolished in 1966 when it eas redistributed into Compton and Beauce ridings.

Members of Parliament

This riding elected the following Members of Parliament:

Election results

See also 

 List of Canadian federal electoral districts
 Past Canadian electoral districts

External links
Riding history from the Library of Parliament

Former federal electoral districts of Quebec